Eucalyptus nandewarica, commonly known as mallee red gum, is a species of tree or mallee that is endemic to a small area of western New South Wales. It has mostly smooth bark, lance-shaped adult leaves, flower buds in groups of three or seven, white flowers and cup-shaped or hemispherical fruit.

Description
It has smooth, greyish bark mottled with other colours, sometimes with some rough, fibrous bark near the base. Flowering has been observed in December and the flowers are white.

Taxonomy and naming
Eucalyptus nandewarica was first formally described in 1990 by Lawrie Johnson and Ken Hill in the journal Telopea, from specimens collected in the Mount Kaputar National Park in 1986. The specific epithet (nandewarica) refers to the Nandewar Range where this species occurs.

Distribution and habitat
Mallee red gum grows in mallee shrubland in the Nandewar Ranges, the Warrumbungle Range and nearby ridges.

References

nandewarica
Myrtales of Australia
Flora of New South Wales
Plants described in 1990
Trees of Australia
Taxa named by Lawrence Alexander Sidney Johnson
Taxa named by Ken Hill (botanist)